Hanna Mangan-Lawrence (born 5 March 1991) is an English-Australian actress, best known in Australia for her role as Holly in the drama series Bed of Roses, for which she received an AFI Award nomination in 2008 and a Logie Award nomination in 2009, and internationally as Seppia in the Starz historical drama Spartacus: Vengeance.

Early life
Mangan-Lawrence is the daughter of Maggie Mangan, an English teacher and playwright, and Ray Lawrence, a geography, economics and business studies teacher. She has a half-sister Roisin, two half-brothers Liam and Reuben, a stepsister Zoe and stepmother Paddy, also a teacher. She has represented Australia overseas as a member of the elite gymnastics team. In 2005, she won "Acrobat of the Year – International – Senior" at the Gymnastics Australia National Awards. In 2009, Mangan-Lawrence completed her high-school education at the Newtown High School of the Performing Arts through Pathways.

Career
Mangan-Lawrence was born in London, UK, and started her film career in 2005 with the short films Simulation 1201 and Galore.  This was followed by a starring role in the short film Sexy Thing in 2006, which was accepted into the Cannes Film Festival.

Mangan-Lawrence was cast in the 2008 horror film Acolytes. She subsequently featured in The Square. She was nominated for a Filmink award for 'Best Australian Newcomer' for this performance.

In 2009, she appeared in the Australian period drama Lucky Country.

Mangan-Lawrence has featured in the Australian drama series Bed of Roses, which screened on the ABC television network. In 2008, she received an AFI Award nomination for "Best Guest or Supporting Actress in a Television Drama" for her role in Bed of Roses She was also nominated for the 'Graham Kennedy Award For Most Outstanding New Talent' at the Logie Awards in 2009.

In 2012, Mangan-Lawrence starred in the feature-film Thirst. She also became a recurring cast member on the Starz television series Spartacus: Vengeance.

In 2016, Mangan-Lawrence appeared in the limited series Containment.

Personal life

She is married to Omar Bustos, a Los Angeles-based producer, and they have a son born in 2019.

Filmography

References

External links

 ABC At The Movies Thirst reviewed 21 March 2012

1991 births
Living people
21st-century Australian actresses
Australian child actresses
Australian film actresses
Australian television actresses
English emigrants to Australia